Cecil Ray Morris (November 8, 1933 - September 12, 2001) was an American football coach and player.  He served as the head football coach at Cameron University in Lawton, Oklahoma from 1981 to 1983. Morris played at the University of Oklahoma under head coach Bud Wilkinson.

References

1933 births
2001 deaths
Cameron Aggies football coaches
Oklahoma Sooners football players
Southwestern Oklahoma State Bulldogs football coaches